The 1990–91 NBA season was the Bucks' 23rd season in the National Basketball Association. During the off-season, the Bucks acquired Frank Brickowski from the San Antonio Spurs, and acquired Danny Schayes from the Denver Nuggets. However, Larry Krystkowiak would miss the entire season with a knee injury. The Bucks started the season on a strong note winning their first 18 home games on their way to a 25–8 start. However, they would lose ten of their next twelve games, and held a 30–19 record at the All-Star break. Sixth man Ricky Pierce and Alvin Robertson were both selected for the 1991 NBA All-Star Game; it was Pierce's only All-Star appearance. At midseason, Pierce was traded to the Seattle SuperSonics in exchange for Dale Ellis. In April, the team signed free agent and former All-Star forward Adrian Dantley, as Ellis went down with a lower back injury. The Bucks would make their 12th consecutive playoff appearance finishing third in the Central Division with a 48–34 record, while posting a 33–8 home record at the Bradley Center.

Ellis played a sixth man role, averaging 19.3 points per game in 21 games, while Jay Humphries averaged 15.2 points, 6.7 assists and 1.6 steals per game, and Robertson provided the team with 13.6 points, 5.7 rebounds, 5.5 assists and led the league with 3.0 steals per game, while being named to the NBA All-Defensive First Team. In addition, Brickowski contributed 12.6 points and 5.7 rebounds per game, while Fred Roberts provided with 10.8 points per game, Schayes provided with 10.6 points and 6.5 rebounds per game, and Jack Sikma contributed 10.4 points and 5.7 rebounds per game. Robertson also finished in third place in Defensive Player of the Year voting, and head coach Del Harris finished tied in fifth place in Coach of the Year voting.

However, without Ellis in the Eastern Conference First Round of the playoffs, the Bucks were swept by the 5th-seeded Philadelphia 76ers in three straight games. This would be their final playoff appearance until 1999. Following the season, Sikma retired.

Draft picks

Roster

Roster Notes
 Forward/center Larry Krystkowiak missed the entire season due to a knee injury, but did play with the team during the playoffs.

Regular season

Season standings

z - clinched division title
y - clinched division title
x - clinched playoff spot

Record vs. opponents

Game log

|-style="background:#fcc;"
| 1 || November 2, 1990 || @ Detroit
| L 104–115
|
|
|
| The Palace of Auburn Hills21,454
| 0-1
|-style="background:#bbffbb;"
| 2 || November 3, 1990 || Minnesota
| W 111–93
|
|
|
| Bradley Center15,102
| 1–1
|-style="background:#bbffbb;"
| 3 || November 6, 1990 || @ Miami
| W 106–94
|
|
|
| Miami Arena15,008
| 2–1
|-style="background:#bbffbb;"
| 4 || November 8, 1990 || Philadelphia
| W 141–111
|Jay Humphries (25)
|Greg Anderson (9)
|Alvin Robertson (12)
| Bradley Center12,476
| 3–1
|-style="background:#bbffbb;"
| 5 || November 9, 1990 || @ Washington
| W 108–100
|Ricky Pierce (25)
|
|
| Capital Centre8,829
| 4–1
|-style="background:#bbffbb;"
| 6 || November 13, 1990 || @ Boston
| W 119–91
|
|
|
| Bradley Center15,321
| 5–1

Playoffs

|- align="center" bgcolor="#ffcccc"
| 1
| April 25
| Philadelphia
| L 90–99
| Frank Brickowski (22)
| Frank Brickowski (9)
| Jay Humphries (9)
| Bradley Center13,587
| 0–1
|- align="center" bgcolor="#ffcccc"
| 2
| April 27
| Philadelphia
| L 112–116 (OT)
| Alvin Robertson (31)
| Frank Brickowski (12)
| Jay Humphries (8)
| Bradley Center15,623
| 0–2
|- align="center" bgcolor="#ffcccc"
| 3
| April 30
| @ Philadelphia
| L 100–121
| Alvin Robertson (26)
| Robertson, Brickowski (5)
| Jay Humphries (8)
| Spectrum16,239
| 0–3
|-

Player statistics

Season

Playoffs

Player statistics source:

Awards and records
 Alvin Robertson, NBA All-Defensive First Team

Transactions

Trades

Free Agents

Player Transactions Citation:

References

See also
 1990-91 NBA season

Milwaukee Bucks seasons
Milwaukee Bucks
Milwaukee Bucks
Milwaukee